Bentwood objects are those made by wetting wood (either by soaking or by steaming), then bending it and letting it harden into curved shapes and patterns.

In furniture making this method is often used in the production of rocking chairs, cafe chairs, and other light furniture. The iconic No. 14 chair by Thonet is a well-known design based on the technique. The process is in widespread use for making casual and informal furniture of all types, particularly seating and table forms. It is also a popular technique in the worldwide production of furniture with frames made of heavy cane, which is commonly imported into European and Western shops.

Bentwood boxes are a traditional item made by the First Nations people of the North American west coast including the Haida, Gitxsan, Tlingit, Tsimshian, Sugpiaq, Unangax, Yup'ik, Inupiaq and Coast Salish. These boxes are generally made out of one piece of wood that is steamed and bent to form a box. Traditional uses of the boxes was varied and included storage of food goods, clothing and for burial. They were often without decoration while others were decorated elaborately. Today many are made for collectors and can be purchased from museums, gift shops and online sites as well as directly commissioned from the artists.

The Aleut or Unangan People of Alaska made hunting visors, called chagudax, out of driftwood using the bentwood method. The visors were used by hunters who were in kayaks. They are said to help keep the sea spray off the face as well as improve hearing. They were often decorated with paints, beads, sea lion whiskers and ivory figurines. Andrew Gronholdt is credited with reviving the art of chagudax carving in the 1980s. Present day Unangan artists create chagudax for ceremonial purposes and offer them for sale to the public as well.

See also 
 Ercol
 Lucian Ercolani
 Twig work
 First Nations Art
 Shaker-style pantry box
 Steam bending

References

External links

AllWoodwork.com – Methods of Bending Wood
FineWoodWorking.com – Skills and Techniques
Taylor's Classics – The History and Popularity of Bentwood Furniture
Thillmann Collection: The world's largest private collection of Thonet and bentwood furniture
Woodweb.com – Rx For Bending Wood: Dr. Gene Wengert offers advice on bending solid lumber in production applications

Decorative arts
Woodworking